The Ateneo de Manila University (Filipino: Pamantasang Ateneo de Manila;) is a Catholic, private research university in Quezon City, Philippines.

Founded in 1859 as the Escuela Municipal by the Society of Jesus, the Ateneo is the third-oldest extant university in the country. This article deals solely with the university’s culture and traditions.

Name
The Spanish term Ateneo is derived from the Latin word Athenæum, denoting a temple to Athena, goddess of wisdom, warfare, and the tutelary of the city of Athens in Greek mythology. The closest English gloss for this term is academy.

The Society of Jesus in the Philippines established several other schools beginning in 1856, nine of them were named “Ateneo”. Over the years, the name became recognized as the official title of Jesuit institutions of higher learning in the islands.

Motto 
The present motto of the university is "Lux in Domino" ("Light in the Lord"), taken from :

For you were heretofore darkness, but now light in the Lord.

This motto first appeared as part of the Ateneo seal introduced by Father Rector Joaquín Añón, S.J. for the school’s golden jubilee in 1909.

This is not the school's original motto. The Escuela Municipal in 1859 adopted the motto "Al mérito y a la virtud" ("In Merit and in Virtue"). This motto persisted through the school's renamings in 1865 and 1901.

The Lux in Domino Award is given to an individual who has embodied by their life, and perhaps even death, in an outstanding and exemplary manner, the noblest ideals of the Ateneo de Manila University.

Seal
In 1859, the Escuela Municipal bore the coat of arms of the City of Manila, which were granted by King Philip II of Spain to the city in 1596. When the title "Ateneo" was added to the school's name in 1865, the seal incorporated the Jesuit monogram "IHS" and Marian symbols. During the 1909 jubilee, clearer Marian symbols were added, along with the current motto. For the Ateneo’s diamond jubilee in 1929, Father Rector Richard O’Brien, S.J. introduced the present seal, which replaces the arms of Manila with mostly Jesuit and Ignatian symbols.

The seal is defined by two semi-circular ribbons. The crown ribbon contains the school motto, "Lux-in-Domino", while the base ribbon contains the school name, "Ateneo de Manila". These ribbons define a circular field on which rests the shield of Oñaz-Loyola: the impaled arms of the paternal and maternal families of St. Ignatius of Loyola.
 The shield is gold, and divided vertically.

To the viewer's left is a field of gold with seven red bands. These are the arms of Oñaz, Ignatius' paternal family, which commemorates seven family heroes who fought with the Spaniards against 70,000 French, Navarrese, and Gascons. To the viewer's right is a white or silver (argent) field with the arms of Loyola, Ignatius' maternal family. The arms consist of a two-eared pot hanging from a chain between two rampant wolves, which symbolize nobility. The name "Loyola" is a contraction of lobos y olla (wolves and pot) and comes from the family's reputation of being able to provide so well that they could feed a pack of wolves. Above the shield is a Basque sunburst, referring to Ignatius' Basque roots, and also representing a consecrated host. It bears the letters IHS, the first three letters of the Holy Name "Jesus" in Greek, emblematic of the Society of Jesus.

White and blue are the school colours, honouring the Blessed Virgin Mary; red and gold are the national colours of Spain, home of Ignatius and of Ateneo’s Jesuit founders. These four colours together echo the Philippine flag, marking the Ateneo’s identity as a Filipino university.

Marian devotions

Ateneans value symbols of devotion to María la Purísima Concepción (Our Lady of the Immaculate Conception), Queen of the Ateneo. Among them are the custom of keeping a rosary in the pocket or bag, and the October Medal, which is a small Miraculous Medal, attached to a royal blue bow and pinned to the left breast. Thousands of these medals are blessed as sacramentals and distributed to students, faculty, and staff at the beginning of October, and are worn throughout the month.

A Song for Mary
The original school anthem was "Hail Ateneo, Hail", a marching tune adapted from Fordham Ram, the fight song of the Jesuit-run Fordham University. Upon moving to Loyola Heights in the 1950s, the school adopted A Song for Mary as its graduation hymn and is now widely considered the school anthem. Fr. James B. Reuter, S.J., wrote its lyrics and Ateneo band moderator Colonel José Campaña adapted the melody from the Canadian hymn O Canada (which was adopted as that country’s national anthem in 1980).

Mascot
In the 1930s, the Ateneo adopted the Blue Eagle as its symbol; the precise species varies from depiction to depiction. The Philippine Eagle (Pithecophaga jefferyi) is also the national bird of the Philippines.

References 

Ateneo de Manila University
Ateneo de Manila University